Saadé is a surname. Notable people with the surname include:

Antoun Saadé, Lebanese philosopher, writer and politician who founded the Syrian Social Nationalist Party
Eric Saadé, Swedish pop singer
Jacques Saadé (1937-2018), French billionaire, founder of CMA CGM
Rodolphe Saadé (born 1970), French billionaire, son of Jacques